Made Wijaya (22 March 1953 – 28 August 2016) was an Australian landscape gardener who was based in Bali.

A world-renowned tropical garden designer, he was one of the island's most flamboyant, controversial and larger-than-life characters, an artist, designer, photographer, videographer, landscape designer and gardener, historian, journalist, humourist, satirist, diarist, anthropologist and more.

In 1973 Made Wijaya (born Michael White) sailed to Bali on a break from Architectural studies, the ketch having difficulty landing in the high seas, Made impatiently jumped overboard to swim ashore.

His break became permanent as he immersed himself in Bali life, living with a Brahmin family, who informally adopted him, and visiting regularly with the Balinese royal families he learned much of the island's intricate rituals and history, "gaining an almost encyclopaedic knowledge of the island that rivalled that of many Balinese", speaking Balinese fluently. In 1975 he was officially renamed Made Wijaya by a priest in a temple ceremony.

Career
An NSW tennis champion he initially coached tennis and English to the wealthy Balinese, then he started writing a column in The Sunday Bali Post, Stranger in Paradise: Diary of an Expatriate, which extolled great insights into the island's culture with his own brand of caustic wit.

But his own sense of aesthetic drew him back to architecture and garden design and creating tropical gardens became his major endeavour.

His first major project was revamping the Bali Hyatt Hotel in Sanur, then the Oberoi in Seminyak a new resort designed by Australian Architect Peter Muller. He saw the garden as theatre and created dramatic vistas with bright tropical shrubs and creepers flowing from one well-chosen specimen of classical sculpture to another.

Going on to create over 600 tropical gardens in South-East Asia and around the world including David Bowie's garden on the island of Mustique and the Naples Botanical Garden in Florida.

References

Australian landscape architects
1953 births
2016 deaths